Annita Demetriou (Greek: Αννίτα Δημητρίου; born 18 October 1985) is a Cypriot politician, who has served as the first female president of the Democratic Rally (DISY), since March 2023 and as the first female Speaker of the House of Representatives in Cyprus, since June 2021. She is also the youngest person who has served in either role.

Early life and education
Demetriou was born on 18 October 1985 in the village of Troulli, Larnaca District. She graduated with a degree in social and political science from the University of Cyprus in 2007 and a Masters in international relations and European studies from the University of Kent.

Career
Demetriou worked at the University of Cyprus as a Public Relations Officer and a lecturer in International Relations. She was a Special Association at Capital TV presenting the Central News Bulletin.

Demetriou is a member of the conservative Democratic Rally (DISY) party. She was a member of the Troulloi Community Council from 2012 until 2016, and was the first woman on the council. She first stood for election for parliament in 2016, and was initially removed from a list of potential candidates with party spokesman Prodromos Prodromou saying contesting an election was "not a beauty pageant." She was reinstated after pressure from party members at the removal of democratically elected nominees, and she was elected to parliament as representative for the Larnaca District in 2016, before being re-elected in 2021.

Demetriou has been deputy chair of the Parliamentary Committee on Equal Opportunities between Men and Women and the Parliamentary Committee on Education and Culture. In 2018, she was spokesperson for Nicos Anastasiades during his campaign for President. She has been Vice President of DISY since February 2020. In April 2018, she was selected by the French government to participate in the 2018 United Nations Climate Change Conference, and in March 2020 she was an International Visitor Leadership Program observer for the United States primary elections. In July 2020, she worked with AKEL MP Skevi Koukouma to enact legislation that criminalised sexism and discrimination against women.

Demetriou was elected speaker of the House of Representatives on 10 June 2021 in the second round of voting from seven candidates, including front runner and left-wing AKEL party leader Andros Kyprianou, with support from the centrist Democratic Front and far-right ELAM parties. She received 25 votes from the 56 seat parliament, with 22 needed in the second round. She was the first and only female candidate and is the first woman, as well as the youngest person, to be elected to the position. There are only eight women in the parliament and President Anastasiades said her election sent "a strong message ... to all women of Cyprus, to all citizens of Cyprus, that women can and must strive for such positions because they deserve them." She is also the first DISY politician to hold the post, which has usually been held by a member of one of numerous opposition parties.

Because the position of Vice President of Cyprus remains vacant due to ethnic divisions, the Speaker is second in the country's political hierarchy and traditionally performs the duties of Acting President when the President is overseas or otherwise unavailable. In her first week in the role, Demetriou reduced the number of her personal bodyguards to 5, down from the 8 of her predecessor Adamos Adamou and 15 of his predecessor Demetris Syllouris.

Annita Demetriou was elected president of the Democratic Rally in 11 March 2023, after securing 69.18% of the votes of the DISY members. Her only opponent, Demetris Demetriou, lost with 30.82%.

Personal life
Demetriou has been married to Andreas Kyprianou since 2013.

References

External links
 
 2016 interview with Demetriou at the European Parliament's Young Members of Parliament Forum

Living people
1985 births
People from Larnaca
University of Cyprus alumni
Alumni of the University of Kent
Democratic Rally politicians
21st-century Cypriot women politicians
21st-century Cypriot politicians
Presidents of the House of Representatives (Cyprus)
Women legislative speakers